Foumbouni is a town located on the island of Grande Comore in the Comoros.

References

Populated places in Grande Comore